Alessia Patuelli (born 22 December 2002) is an Italian professional racing cyclist, who currently rides for UCI Women's WorldTeam .

References

External links
 

2002 births
Living people
Italian female cyclists
Place of birth missing (living people)
People from Imola
Sportspeople from the Metropolitan City of Bologna
Cyclists from Emilia-Romagna